The Umpqua pikeminnow (Ptychocheilus umpquae) is a large cyprinid fish endemic to Oregon. It is native to the Umpqua and Siuslaw river drainages.

Description 
The Umpqua pikeminnow usually has 60 to 63 scales between the head and dorsal fin. It usually has around 66 to 81 scales along its lateral line. It usually has 9 rays on its dorsal fin and 8 rays on its anal fin. They can reach 44 cm (17.5 in) in total length, but are more often 31 cm (12.2 in).

Distribution and habitat 
The fish are found in the Northwest United States, usually along the Umpqua and Siuslaw river drainages, as well as in the Rogue River.

The fish inhabit the pools or sluggish runs of small rivers and creeks.

References

Ptychocheilus
Endemic fauna of Oregon
Fish of the Western United States
Freshwater fish of the United States
Fish described in 1908